Jökull Andrésson (born 25 August 2001) is an Icelandic professional footballer who plays for Stevenage, on loan from Reading, as a goalkeeper.

Club career
Jökull progressed through the Afturelding academy in his native Iceland before moving to English club Reading in 2017 to join his brother, Axel Óskar Andrésson, in their youth academy. Jökull had trained on and off with Reading since 2014. Jökull turned professional with Reading on his 17th birthday in August 2018, and spent the first half of the 2018–19 season on loan at Hungerford Town. One of Hungerford's games was abandoned after he suffered a concussion with 15 minutes of play remaining. He made five appearances for Hungerford before the loan was cancelled due to injury.

On 22 November 2019, Jökull signed a new contract with Reading, keeping him at the club until the summer of 2022.

He signed for Exeter City on 27 October 2020 on an emergency 7 day loan following injuries to first-team goalkeepers Lewis Ward and Jonny Maxted. He made his debut that same day in a 1–1 draw away at Leyton Orient. After impressing Exeter manager Matt Taylor, Jökull extended his loan with Exeter City for an additional seven days on 2 November, 10 November, 17 November, and 24 November. He made his final appearance for Exeter in their FA Cup Second Round victory over Gillingham, after which Maxted recovered from his injury and returned to the squad for their next game. He made 9 appearances in all competitions for Exeter.

On 22 January 2021 he joined League Two side Morecambe on a seven-day emergency loan deal. After facing Exeter City in his second and final game whilst on loan for Morecambe, Andrésson returned to Exeter City on loan for the remainder of the season on 29 January 2021.

On 23 July 2021, Jökull signed a new three-year contract with Reading, before returning to Morecambe on a season-long loan deal. On 10 January 2022, Jökull was recalled from his loan deal with Morecambe after making 17 appearances.

On 24 January 2023, Jökull returned to Exeter City on an emergency-loan deal. On 31 January he moved on loan to Stevenage.

International career 
Jökull has been capped by Iceland at under-17 and under-19 youth levels.

Jökull made his debut for Iceland U21 on 12 October 2021, in a 1–0 defeat to Portugal U21.

In January 2022, Jökull was called up to the Iceland national team for the first time for matches against Uganda and South Korea in Turkey. Jökull made his debut for Iceland on 12 January 2022, playing the first half in their 1–1 draw against Uganda.

Personal life
His older brother is Axel Óskar Andrésson, who also played for Reading. Their father is strongman Andrés Guðmundsson.

Career statistics

Club

International

References

2001 births
Living people
Jokull Andresson
Jokull Andresson
Jokull Andresson
Reading F.C. players
Hungerford Town F.C. players
Exeter City F.C. players
Morecambe F.C. players
Stevenage F.C. players
National League (English football) players
English Football League players
Association football goalkeepers
Jokull Andresson
Jokull Andresson
Iceland under-21 international footballers
Jokull Andresson